M.Nurullah Tuncer (born 1959 in Van, Turkey), graduated from Mimar Sinan University, Faculty of Fine Arts, Department of Stage and Costume Design with his B.A. and master's degrees. He then worked as an academic for Mimar Sinan University, Department of stage and visual arts from 1985 till 2002. He has been an artist of Istanbul Municipality City Theatres since 1985 as well. He has contributed more than a hundred plays within the company as a stage designer, costume designer and lighting designer. He paints oil paintings since 1987 and has exhibited twice in Istanbul in 1990 and 1996.

Stage designer
 2016 "Empty Rooms" by Stanislav Stratiev, directed by Bilge Emin - Trabzon State Theatre
 2015 " Under The Table" by Roland Topor, directed by Bilge Emin - Skopje Albanian National Theatre
 2013 Marius von Mayenburg's "The Stone", directed by Bilge Emin - Skopje Turkish National Theatre 
 2010 "Red", based on the novel My Name is Red by Orhan Pamuk, directed by Martin Kocovski - Festival MESS-Sarajevo, Festival Exponto-Ljubljana, Montenegrin National Theater, Small Drama Theater-Bitola,National Theatre Sarajevo, National Theatre Bitola, Primorski Summer Festival-Koper, Production B.M.-Skopje.
 2009 "Black Pen" by Jordan Plevnes & İlhami Emin, directed by Vlado Cvetanovski - Skopje Turkish National Theatre
 2008 Molière's "Tartuffe", directed by Rahim Burhan - Kosovo National Theatre
 2008 "The Castle" by Mesa Selimovic, adapted and directed by Nebojsa Bradic - Kruchevo Theatre/Belgrade Drama Theatre
 2007 "La Bohème" by Giacomo Puccini, directed by Sulejman Kupusović - Sarajevo  National Opera and Theatre
 2006 "The Merry Widow" by Franz Lehár, directed by Stephanie Jamnicky - Croatia National Theatre and Opera

Theatre director
 2016  "Peacetime" by Ahmet Hamdi Tanpınar, adapted by Kenan Işık - Istanbul State Theatre
 2015 "The General of the Dead Army" by İsmail Kadare, adapted by Jeton Neziraj - Istanbul Municipal Theatre
 2014 ""General Rehearsal of Suicide" by Dusan Kovacevic - Van State Theatre
 2013 "Yunus Emre" by Recep Bilginer - Sivas State Theatre
 2012 "Life in Tight Shoes" bu Dusan Kovacevic - Istanbul Municipal Theatre
 2011 "The Gathering Place" by Dusan Kovacevic - Istanbul Municipal Theatre
 2010 "Somewhere in the Middle of the World" by Özen Yula - Istanbul Municipal Theatre
 2009 "General Rehearsal of Suicide" by Dusan Kovacevic - Istanbul Municipal Theatre
 2009 "The Dervish and Death" by Mesa Selimovic, adapted by Nebojsa Bradic - Kocaeli Municipal Theatre
 2008 "Somewhere in the Middle of the World" by Özen Yula - Bosnia National Theatre
 2007 "Titanic Orchestra" by Hristo Boytchev - Qatar Theatre Group
 2006 "Ocra with Minced Meat in Pressure Cooker" by Mehmet Baydur - Bosnian National Theatre
 2006 "Mannequin" by Dala Al Rahbi - Syria National Theatre

He has received numerous national and international theatre awards. The plays he directed have been performed at many theatre festivals.

External links
M. Nurullah Tuncer Official Website

1959 births
Turkish theatre directors
Living people